Darrell Dean Tully (December 14, 1917 – February 4, 1997) was an American football player and coach. He played college football at East Texas. A seventh round selection in the 1939 NFL Draft, Tully played one season for the Detroit Lions. Tully was head football coach and athletic director at Spring Branch High School from 1957 until 1964. In 1964 Tully became full-time athletic director for the Spring Branch Independent School District and remained in that capacity until his retirement in 1978. The 15,000-capacity Darrell Tully Stadium in Houston, Texas is named in his honor.

References

1917 births
1997 deaths
American football halfbacks
Detroit Lions players
Georgia Pre-Flight Skycrackers football players
Texas A&M–Commerce Lions football players
Texas A&M–Commerce Lions men's basketball players
Texas A&M–Commerce Lions men's basketball coaches
College men's basketball head coaches in the United States
High school football coaches in Texas
People from Eastland, Texas
People from Henryetta, Oklahoma
Players of American football from Texas